The 1990–91 Michigan State Spartans men's basketball team represented Michigan State University in the 1990–91 NCAA Division I men's basketball season. The team played their home games at Breslin Center in East Lansing, Michigan and were members of the Big Ten Conference. They were coached by Jud Heathcote in his 15th year at Michigan State. The Spartans finished the season with a record of 19–11, 11–7 to finish in third place in Big Ten play. They received an at-large bid to the NCAA tournament as a No. 5 seed in the Midwest region where they beat Green Bay on a buzzer beater by Steve Smith. In the Second Round, they lost to No. 10 Utah in double overtime, 85–84.

The game marked the end of First Team All-American senior Steve Smith's career at Michigan State.

Previous season
The Spartans finished the 1989–90 season with a record of 28–6, 15–3 to win the Big Ten Championship. Michigan State received the conference's automatic bid to the NCAA tournament as the No. 1 seed in the Southeast region. They beat Murray State and UC Santa Barbara to advance to the Sweet Sixteen. There they were upset by Georgia Tech in overtime.

Roster 

Source

Schedule and results

|-
!colspan=9 style=| Non-conference regular season

|-
!colspan=9 style=| Big Ten regular season

|-
!colspan=9 style=|NCAA tournament

Rankings

Source.

Awards and honors
 Steve Smith – All-Big Ten First Team

References

Michigan State Spartans men's basketball seasons
Michigan State
Michigan State
Michigan State Spartans men's b
Michigan State Spartans men's b